Sebastián Báez (born 28 December 2000) is an Argentine professional tennis player.

Báez has a career high ATP singles ranking of world No. 31 achieved on 1 August 2022 and doubles ranking of world No. 514 achieved on 12 October 2020. Báez has won two ATP titles, and six ATP Challenger singles titles, 5 ITF titles and 1 ITF doubles title to date. Báez became the top-ranked junior in the ITF combined ranking on 12 March 2018.

Career

2021: ATP debut, six Challenger titles, NextGen finals & top 100 

Báez made his ATP debut at the 2021 Chile Open where he lost to 2019 Junior French Open champion Holger Vitus Nødskov Rune in straight sets.

He earned his first tour-level win at the 2021 Hamburg European Open, where he defeated Frenchman Corentin Moutet in the first round.

Baez became the youngest player in history to claim five ATP Challenger Tour titles in a season, lifting the trophy in Concepcion (d. F. Cerundolo), Santiago (d. Barrios Vera), Zagreb (d. Varillas), Santiago-3 (d. Meligeni Rodrigues Alves) and Buenos Aires (d. Monteiro).
He qualified for the 2021 Next Generation ATP Finals in Milan after the withdrawal of Jenson Brooksby due to an abdominal injury. Baez advanced to the semi-finals with wins over third seed Lorenzo Musetti and eighth seed Hugo Gaston. He lost in the semifinals against top seed Carlos Alcaraz.

He reached the top 100 for the first time in his career at World No. 97 in the ATP year-end rankings on 22 November 2021 after winning his sixth Challenger in Campinas, Brazil.

2022: Major debut & first wins, Maiden title & Top-10 win, Top 35 debut 

Baez started the year in the 2022 Melbourne Summer Set 1 where he lost in the final round of qualifying and got in the main draw as a lucky loser. He was defeated by Emil Ruusuvuori in straight sets on the first round. The following week at the 2022 Sydney International, Baez got entry as a qualifier and defeated Christopher O'Connell in three sets. He lost in the second round to Lorenzo Sonego.

On his debut at the 2022 Australian Open he defeated Albert Ramos Viñolas for his first Grand Slam win in his career. In the second round he faced a top-10 opponent for the first time in his career, World No. 4 Stefanos Tsitsipas. He lost in four sets in a hard fought match. As a result he entered the top 80 at World No. 77 on 31 January 2022. 

He reached his first ATP-level quarterfinal at the 2022 Córdoba Open, defeating Fernando Verdasco and World No. 18 and third seed Cristian Garín. Baez received a wildcard in his hometown tournament, the 2022 Argentina Open, where he defeated Holger Rune and lost again to Lorenzo Sonego in the second round. The following week at the 2022 Rio Open, he surpassed the qualyifing stages with three-set wins against Nikola Milojević and Yannick Hanfmann. He was defeated by Thiago Monteiro in the first round.

At the 2022 Chile Open Baez was the 7th seed, the first time he was seeded in an ATP tournament. He reached his maiden ATP Tour final, defeating Juan Pablo Varillas, fellow countryman Juan Ignacio Londero, Thiago Monteiro and Albert Ramos-Viñolas in the semis. He lost to Pedro Martínez in the final. As a result he reached the top 60 on 7 March 2022.

At the 2022 Estoril Open Baez reached the second semifinal of the season defeating third seed Marin Cilic and Richard Gasquet en route. As a result of reaching the semifinals, he debuted in the top 50. Next he defeated Albert Ramos Viñolas to reach his second final of the season and of his career. He won his maiden title defeating third seed Frances Tiafoe and moved into the top 40 on 2 May 2022.

He made his debut at the 2022 French Open and at the 2022 Wimbledon Championships and won his first match at each of the Majors defeating Dusan Lajovic and Taro Daniel respectively.

He reached his third final at the 2022 Swedish Open in Bastad with a win over second seed, top-10  player Andrey Rublev, where he lost to compatriot Francisco Cerundolo. He reached a career-high ranking of No. 32 on 18 July 2022.

In October seeded sixth, he defeated No. 50 Lorenzo Sonego at the 2022 Tennis Napoli Cup and snapped an 11-match losing streak.

2023: Second clay title
In February, he won his second title on clay defeating compatriot Federico Coria.

ATP career finals

Singles: 4 (2 title, 2 runner-ups)

Challenger and Futures/World Tennis Tour finals

Singles: 17 (11–6)

Doubles: 3 (1–2)

Junior Grand Slam finals

Singles: 1 (1 final)

Performance timeline

Current through the 2022 Basel Open.

Singles

Record against top 10 players
Báez's record against players who have been ranked in the top 10, with those who are active in boldface. Only ATP Tour main draw matches are considered:

Wins over 10 players

Notes

References

External links

  
  

2000 births
Living people
Argentine male tennis players
Tennis players from Buenos Aires
Tennis players at the 2018 Summer Youth Olympics
Youth Olympic gold medalists for Argentina